Monique Proulx (born January 17, 1952 in Quebec City, Quebec) is a Canadian novelist, short story writer and screenwriter. She is a two-time nominee for the Governor General's Award for French language fiction for Le Cœur est un muscle involontaire at the 2002 Governor General's Awards and Champagne at the 2008 Governor General's Awards, and won the Prix Québec-Paris in 1993 for Homme invisible à la fenêtre.

As a screenwriter her credits have included the films The Big Snake of the World (Le Grand Serpent du monde), The Sex of the Stars (Le Sexe des étoiles), Streetheart (Le cœur au poing), Memories Unlocked (Souvenirs intimes) and Deliver Me (Délivrez-moi). She received two Genie Award nominations for Best Screenplay at the 20th Genie Awards in 2000, in both the Original Screenplay category for The Big Snake of the World and the Adapted Screenplay category for Memories Unlocked.

Works
Sans cœur et sans reproche, (1983)
Le sexe des étoiles (1987)
The Sex of the Stars (1996)
Homme invisible à la fenêtre (1993)
Invisible Man at the Window (1994)
Les Aurores montréales (1996)
Aurora Montrealis (1997)
Le Cœur est un muscle involontaire (2002)
The Heart is an Involuntary Muscle (2003)
Champagne (2008)

References

1952 births
Canadian women novelists
Canadian screenwriters in French
Canadian short story writers in French
French Quebecers
Living people
Writers from Quebec City
Canadian women short story writers
Canadian novelists in French
20th-century Canadian novelists
21st-century Canadian novelists
20th-century Canadian women writers
20th-century Canadian short story writers
21st-century Canadian short story writers
21st-century Canadian women writers
Canadian women screenwriters
Université Laval alumni